1. Name:

i) Present Name: Yudhistiresvara Siva Temple.

ii) Past Name: —

2. Location: , Elev 124 ft

i) Address & Approach: Yudhistiresvara Siva Temple is located in the Bhimesvara
Temple Precinct in Kapila Prasad, Housing Board Colony, Bhimatangi, Bhubaneswar. It is
situated on the left side of the Bhubaneswar-Jatni road leading from Punama gate to Jatani.
The temple is facing towards east. The enshrined deity is a Siva lingam over a circular
yonipitha.

ii) Tradition & legends: Local people associate the Pandavas with the site on
account of a pair of large foot, which are called Bhimapada (feet of Bhima).

3. Ownership

i) Single/ Multiple: Multiple

ii) Public/ Private: Private

iii) Any other (specify): Bhimesvara Mandira Parichalana Samiti.

iv) Name: Purusottama Sahu. (President)

v) Address:

4. Age

i)Precise date: —

ii) Approximate date: 19th Century A.D

iii) Source of Information: Local tradition.

5. Property Type

i) Precinct/ Building/ Structure/Landscape/Site/Tank: Precinct.

ii) Subtype: Temple.

iii) Typology: Pidha deul

6. Property use

i) Abandoned/ in use: In use

ii) Present use: Living Temple

iii) Past use: Worshipped

7. Significance

i) Historic significance: Not found

ii) Cultural significance: Sivaratri, Sankranti, Bada Ossa, Kartika purnima,
Rudrabhiseka, Jalabhiseka.

iii) Social significance: Marriage, thread ceremony, mundanakriya.

iv) Associational significance:—

8. Physical description

i) Surrounding : It is surrounded by the rest house of the precinct in west
and the temple compound wall in north east.

ii) Orientation: The temple facing towards east.

iii) Architectural features (Plan and Elevation): On plan, the temple has a square vimana
measuring 2.90 m2. On elevation, the vimana is in pidha order that measures 5.37
m in height. From bottom to the top the temple has a bada, gandi and mastaka. With threefold divisions of the bada the temple has a trianga bada measuring 2.37 m in height. The
pabhaga is plain measuring 0.42 m, Jangha 1.30 m and baranda 0.65 m in height.
The gandi measuring 2.30 m has eleven receding tiers. The mastaka measures 0.70
m.
48

iv) Raha niche & parsva devatas: The Parsvadevata niches are located on the raha
paga of the jangha on the three sides of north, west and south. There is a four armed Ganesa
on the southern niche, Parvati image on the northern niche and the western niche is empty.

v) Decorative features: —
Door Jambs: The doorjambs measure 1.72 m x 0.62 m.
Lintel: There is no graha panel.

vi) Building material: Laterite

vii) Construction techniques: Lime mortar and cement plaster

viii) Style: Kalingan.

ix) Special features, if any: —

9. State of preservation

i) Good/Fair/ Showing Signs of Deterioration/Advanced: Good

ii) State of Decay/Danger of Disappearance: —

10. Condition description

i) Signs of distress: Not found due to recent construction.

ii) Structural problems: —

iii) Repairs and Maintenance: Bhimesvara Mandira Parichalana Samiti.

11. Grade (A/B/C)

i) Architecture: C

ii) Historic: C

iii) Associational: B

iv) Social/Cultural: C

v) Others:

12. Threats to the property:
Conservation Problem and Remedies: —

13. Reference notes:

14. Maps / Plan / Drawings:

15. Date of Documentation: 15.10.2006

16. Documenter: Dr. Sadasiba Pradhan and team.

Hindu temples in Bhubaneswar